Gosnold is a surname. Notable people with the surname include:

Bartholomew Gosnold (1571–1607), English lawyer, explorer, and privateer
Henry Gosnold ( 1560– 1655), English lawyer in Ireland
John Gosnold (by 1507–1554), English politician